Greta Hall Goodwin (October 1, 1936 - December 8, 2010) was a Democratic member of the Kansas Senate, representing the 32nd district from 1997 until 2008. Earlier, she was a member of the Kansas House of Representatives from 1993 through 1996.

Birth
Goodwin was born in Winfield, Kansas on October 1, 1936.

Family
Greta Goodwin was married to James, who also goes as "Jim", and together they had four children.

Residence
Greta Goodwin resided in Winfield, Kansas where she also was raised.

Education
Goodwin received her education from the following:
Certification, National Certified Legal Assistant, 1988
Legal Assistant Degree, Wichita State University
Attended Cowley County Community College

Professional experience
Goodwin has had the following professional experience:
Banking Profession
Certified Legal Assistant
Adjunct Faculty, Cowley County Community College
Law Profession

Political Experience
Goodwin had the following political experience:
Candidate, Kansas State Senate, District 32, 2008
Senator, Kansas State Senate, 1996–2008
Representative, Kansas State House, 1992–1996

External links
Kansas Legislature - Greta Goodwin official government website
Project Vote Smart - Senator Greta Goodwin (KS) profile
Follow the Money - Greta Goodwin
2008 2006 2004 2002 2000 1998 1996 campaign contributions

References

1936 births
2010 deaths
People from Winfield, Kansas
Methodists from Kansas
Democratic Party members of the Kansas House of Representatives
Democratic Party Kansas state senators
Women state legislators in Kansas
Wichita State University alumni